Osmotherley is a village and civil parish in the Hambleton hills in North Yorkshire, six miles north-east of Northallerton. The village is at the western edge of the North York Moors National Park. Osmotherley is on the route of the 110-mile Cleveland Way, one of the National Trails established by Natural England.

Origin of name
Osmotherley probably means the clearing or 'ley', belonging to a Viking called 'Asmund' or a Saxon called 'Osmund'. In Domesday Book it was recorded as Asmundrelac and subsequently as Osmundeslay and Osmonderlay.

Local legend says that Osmotherley was named after the mother of a villager named Oswald or Osmund, who went out to gather firewood in the winter. When she did not return her son became anxious and went out to look for her. He found her lying in the snow, dead or dying from the cold. Because he was not able to carry her back, he lay down beside her and died himself. It is where Oswald's mother lies, hence Osmotherley.

Governance
Located in the North Riding of Yorkshire, a division of the historic county of Yorkshire, Osmotherley has been administered as part of the non-metropolitan county of North Yorkshire since 1972. North Yorkshire Police, created by the same Local Government Act 1972 as the non-metropolitan county, are responsible for Osmotherley.

An electoral ward of the same name stretches north and south from the village and had a population at the 2011 census of 1,764. It is in the Richmond parliamentary constituency.

Amenities

The village school, Osmotherley Primary School, was founded 1857 and the present building dates from 1878. It is on School Lane and has fewer than 50 pupils.

Osmotherley has three public houses within a  radius: the Queen Catherine, the Three Tuns and the Golden Lion. The village also has a newsagents, a Top Shop, a Youth Hostel and an antique shop. In 2019, the Osmotherley Fish and Chip Shop was named the best fish and chip shop in Northern England at the England Business Awards event. Thompson, the shop that served Osmotherley since 1786, and an Art and Craft Shop have both recently closed.

Goods were exchanged or bartered on the table and it is now a grade II listed structure.

Religion

The Anglican parish church dedicated to St Peter is built on an Angle site and parts of the building date from the Norman period. Largely rebuilt by architect C. Hodgson Fowler in 1892, it is a grade II* listed building.

John Wesley preached at the Barter Table on the green on several occasions, the first in 1745. In 1754 a Methodist Chapel was erected in Chapel Yard.

Osmotherley Friends Meeting House, a traditional stone building, was erected in 1690 or 1723. Meetings are held monthly. It is thought that George Fox may have visited the village in the late-17th century.

Geography 

The village is in the North York Moors, one of the largest areas of moorland in Great Britain.

Cod Beck Reservoir to the north is named from Cod Beck, a tributary of the River Swale. The beck derives its name from the Celtic word 'Coed', meaning woody. Just before Cod Beck reaches the reservoir is a picturesque location called Sheepwash.

Osmotherley is close to the western terminus of the Lyke Wake Walk.  The official starting point is at the edge of the moors above the village where there is a stone marker.

About 1½ miles from Osmotherley near the A19 is Mount Grace Priory. Its ruins are situated at the foot of a steep wooded hill with a footpath leading into the village. The Carthusian religious house was founded around 1396.

In popular culture

Osmotherley is the setting of some of the final chapters of the novel Brother in the Land by Robert Swindells. In the novel, many towns and cities are hit by individually programmed nuclear missiles, but because of Osmotherley's small size, the village is spared.

See also
The Shrine of Our Lady of Mount Grace

References

External links

Osmotherley Website
Osmotherley Community Website

 
Villages in North Yorkshire
Civil parishes in North Yorkshire
Hambleton District